Orchestrion is a studio album by jazz guitarist Pat Metheny that was released by Nonesuch Records on January 26, 2010.

Metheny's orchestrionics were built by Eric Singer and the League of Electronic Musical Urban Robots, Ken Caulkins at Ragtime West, Mark Herbert, Cyril Lance, and Peterson Electro-Musical Products. The set includes pianos, marimba, vibraphone, orchestra bells, basses, GuitarBots, percussion, cymbals and drums, blown bottles and other custom-fabricated, acoustic, mechanical instruments.

Track listing

Personnel
 Pat Metheny – guitar and orchestrionics

Charts
Album – Billboard

References 

Pat Metheny albums
2010 albums
Nonesuch Records albums
Instrumental albums